Visit Ventures is an Egyptian/British company, organized in London and based in Cairo, Egypt, that owns and operates a travel fare aggregator and travel guide meta-search engine. Its flagship website is Visit Guide that operates in about 14 countries.

Visit Guide is accessible via website and mobile for iOS and Android.

History 
In Early 2019, It faced restrictions in Egypt since the Egyptian Government banned new travel agencies registration.

In October 2019, It tried to form a partnership with Amadeus GDS in order to launch their platform and faced government restrictions.

In Mid 2019, The company moved to United Kingdom to pass the travel agency restrictions in Egypt.

References 

Travel agencies
Travel ticket search engines
Online travel agencies
Companies based in Cairo